Sulo Eetu Jussila (7 September 1882, in Orivesi – 15 June 1973) was a Finnish farmer and politician. He was a member of the Parliament of Finland from 1929 to 1930 and again from 1931 to 1933, representing the Agrarian League. He was the younger brother of Kustaa Jussila.

References

1882 births
1973 deaths
People from Orivesi
People from Häme Province (Grand Duchy of Finland)
Centre Party (Finland) politicians
Members of the Parliament of Finland (1929–30)
Members of the Parliament of Finland (1930–33)